Group D of the 2006 FIFA World Cup began on 11 June and completed on 21 June 2006. Portugal won the group, and advanced to the second round, along with Mexico. Angola and Iran failed to advance.

Standings

Portugal advanced to play the Netherlands (runners-up of Group C) in the round of 16.
Mexico advanced to play Argentina (winners of Group C) in the round of 16.

Matches
All times local (CEST/UTC+2)

Mexico vs Iran

Angola vs Portugal

Mexico vs Angola

Portugal vs Iran

Portugal vs Mexico

Iran vs Angola

D group
Portugal at the 2006 FIFA World Cup
Iran at the 2006 FIFA World Cup
Angola at the 2006 FIFA World Cup
Mexico at the 2006 FIFA World Cup